Harry Jewitt-White (born 26 March 2004) is a Welsh footballer who plays for Gosport Borough on loan from Portsmouth as  a midfielder.

Club career

Portsmouth
Jewitt-White made his Portsmouth debut in a 1–0 defeat vs West Ham United U21s on 10 November 2020 in the EFL Trophy. Jewitt-White, who is 16 years and 230 days old, is now the third-youngest player in Portsmouth's post-World War II history.  

On 12 January 2021, he made his second Portsmouth appearance, starting in a 5–1 defeat at Peterborough United in the EFL Trophy.

On 21 January 2022, Jewitt-White joined Havant & Waterlooville on loan until the end of the season.

On 16 August 2022 he joined Gosport Borough on loan until January 2023.

International career
Jewitt-White is eligible to represent both England and Wales at international level. In October 2020 and March 2021, Jewitt-White was called up to Wales U17 training camps but no games were played due to the COVID-19 pandemic.

On 16 August 2021, Jewitt-White was called up to Wales U18 for the first time. He made his debut on 3 September 2021, coming on at half time in a 1-1 draw with England U18.

Career statistics

References

2004 births
Living people
Welsh footballers
Wales youth international footballers
Association football defenders
Portsmouth F.C. players
Footballers from Portsmouth